Adventureland was an amusement park located in Addison, Illinois which operated from 1961 to 1977. The land where the park is located was originally a restaurant and tavern known as Paul's Picnic Grove and, from 1958 to 1961, was a family attraction site known as Storybook Park.

From 1967 to 1976, it was the largest amusement park in Illinois. Attractions at the park included Dizzy Hofbrauhaus, Scrambler, Crash 'n Splash Torpedo Tubs, Western Round-Up, Bumper Cars, Italian Bobs, which reached 35 ft. high, and Super Italian Bobs, which reached 60 ft. The park offered parking for 3,000 cars.

History
The former Storybook Park was sold to Durell Everding, whose family also owned Santa's Village (now Santa's Village AZoosment Park) in 1961 and renamed Adventureland. Some attractions from Storybook Park were kept, but the new owner began to focus on adding more rides to the park to attract older visitors as well. Owner Durell Everding died in 1970 and the park was run by his family until it was later purchased by Medinah Investors. The park closed in 1977 as the result of competition from newer parks; the park's rides and attractions were sold off upon the park's closing. 

Since the park's closing, Medinah Road on the site's east side was re-routed through part of the property. The Scottish Rite Valley of Chicago building now occupies most of the site, although aerial views show evidence of the park's trails, while urban explorers have reported finding remains of park buildings and ride foundations on the site.

References

External links
Pictures of Adventureland
 Storybook Park photo site
 Bloomingdale Library Picture Archives

Defunct amusement parks in the United States
Addison, Illinois
1961 establishments in Illinois
1977 disestablishments in Illinois
Buildings and structures in DuPage County, Illinois
Amusement parks in Illinois
Amusement parks closed in 1977
Amusement parks opened in 1961